The Blue Note Label Group was formed in late 2006 by the major record company EMI and is currently owned by the Universal Music Group. It is home to many alternative, classical and jazz artists, and contains the following labels:

Labels under Blue Note Label Group
 Angel Records
 Back Porch Records
 Blue Note Records
 Manhattan Records
 Mosaic Records
 Narada Productions
 Higher Octave
 Real World Records

Following labels were sold to Warner Music Group as part of Parlophone in 2013:

 EMI Classics (absorbed into Warner Classics)
 Virgin Classics (absorbed into Erato Records)

External links
 Official site

2006 establishments in the United States
American record labels
EMI
Universal Music Group